SLRC may refer to:
San Luis Río Colorado, a city in Sonora, Mexico
Saint Lucia Red Cross, a Society founded in 1949 as part of the British Red Cross, and created as an independent agency in 1983 
Sierra Leone Red Cross Society, a Sierra Leone society, based in Freetown
Southern Legal Resource Center, a nonprofit legal center in the US state of South Carolina
Sri Lanka Rifle Corps, a reserve regiment of the Sri Lanka Army
Sri Lanka Rupavahini Corporation, the national television system of Sri Lanka
Strategic Long Range Cannon, a U.S. Army project to develop a cannon with a range exceeding 1,100 miles